Moyencharia joeli is a moth of the family Cossidae. It is found in north-central and north-east central Nigeria and probably north-western Cameroon. The habitat consists of a mosaic of wooded farmland and drier peripheral semi-evergreen Guineo-Congolian rain forests and riparian forests at low elevations.

The wingspan is about 22 mm. The forewings are warm buff and light orange yellow mixed with sepia and clay colour. The hindwings are warm buff and ivory yellow.

Etymology
The species is named for Joel Mutisya Kioko.

References

Moths described in 2013
Moyencharia
Insects of West Africa
Moths of Africa